Klos is a town and a municipality in Mat District, northern center Albania. It was formed at the 2015 local government reform by the merger of the former municipalities Gurrë, Klos, Suç and Xibër, that became municipal units. The seat of the municipality is the town Klos. The total population is 16,618 (2011 census), in a total area of 357.72 km2. The population of the former municipality at the 2011 census was 7,873. Klos lies 28.5 kilometers (17¾ mi) 'as the crow flies' from Tirana and 14 kilometers (9 mi) from Burrel.

Demographic history
Klos (Kilos) is recorded in the Ottoman defter of 1467 as a hass-ı mir-liva and derbendci settlement in the vilayet of Mati. The village had a total of eight households represented by the following household heads: Kozma Kimiza, Progon Shargjini, Martin Doroza, Gjin Doroza, Dula Cukali, Margjin Prifti, Ilia Kimiza, and Kola Kimiza.

Economy
The land is suited for agriculture and the economy is based on agriculture, with many houses having farms and selling their products in local markets known as Tregu. There are mini markets, bars and cafés, too. Their activity produces much tax revenue.

Subdivisions
Gurrë, Klos, Suç, Xibër

Sports
Klos has a football team known as FC Klosi playing in the Albanian Second Division. Playing in Klos.

References

External links
Klos: Nona.net
Albania: Population

Municipalities in Dibër County
 
Administrative units of Klos (municipality)
Towns in Albania